Sun Wen (born 6 April 1973) is a Chinese former professional footballer who played as a forward. She previously captained the China national team and the Atlanta Beat of the Women's United Soccer Association (WUSA).

In 2000, she won the FIFA Female Player of the Century along with Michelle Akers. Sun won both the Golden Ball (top player) and Golden Boot (top scorer) for her performance at the 1999 FIFA Women's World Cup. She is considered one of the all-time greats of the women's game.

Early life 
Sun began playing football around the age of ten. Her father, Sun Zonggao, was a recreational football player who took Sun with him to watch matches in the Chinese men's league. Sun credits him for influencing her foray into the sport.

Sun studied Chinese literature at the University of Shanghai.

Playing career

Club

Shanghai SVA 
Sun played for the Shanghai team in the Chinese women's league.

Atlanta Beat 
Sun played for the Atlanta Beat of the Women's United Soccer Association from 2001 to 2002.  She was the first overall pick of the WUSA's Inaugural Draft, but a knee and ankle injury limited her first season with the Beat to 13 games with five starts. During the league's semifinal match against the Philadelphia Charge, the Beat were down 2–0; however, Sun scored on a penalty kick and then provided the assist on the equalizer goal with a corner kick headed in by Cindy Parlow. The Beat would go on to win the match 3–2. She then notched the Beat's third goal in the Founders Cup, helping the team to an eventual 3–3 tie during regulation. The San Jose CyberRays won the title in a penalty kick shootout.

During the 2002 season, Sun played in 18 games, making 10 starts. She scored four goals as the Beat earned another chance at the playoffs, but the Beat were eliminated in the semifinals.

Sun announced her retirement from the WUSA in January 2003 to return to China in preparation for the 2003 FIFA Women's World Cup.

International 
Sun appeared on China's national squad at the age of 17 and went on to appear in four FIFA Women's World Cup tournaments for China and became one of three women to have played all of China's 15 matches in its three World Cup appearances. In 1999, she had 10 goals in her World Cup career, leaving her tied for second place on an all-time scoring list.

Sun helped the national team win the Asian Cup in 1991, 1993, 1995 and 1997.

Sun led China to a silver medal at the 1996 Summer Olympics in Athens, Georgia. During the 1999 FIFA Women's World Cup, Sun scored seven goals and earned the Golden Ball (top player) and Golden Boot (top scorer) at the tournament.

She returned to the Chinese women's team from a two-year retirement on 15 December 2005. Due to injury reasons, Sun retired again after winning AFC Women's Asian Cup in 2006.

Matches and goals scored at World Cup and Olympic tournaments 
Sun played 28 matches and scored 16 goals in 4 world cup tournaments and 2 Olympics: China 1991,
Sweden 1995,
Atlanta 1996,
USA 1999,
Sydney 2000,
USA 2003; she played and started every match for China.
Sun Wen, with her China teams, won a silver medal at Atlanta 1996 Olympics, and finished second at USA 1999 world cup.

Honors and awards 
A strong striker with great skills and passing abilities, Sun won both the Golden Boot (which she shared with Sissi, of Brazil) and the Golden Ball for the 1999 Women's World Cup, and became the first woman to be nominated for the Asian Football Confederation player of the year award.

In 2002, she received the FIFA Internet Award in the FIFA Female Player of the Century voting. While the overall award was won by American Michelle Akers, Sun received the most internet votes on the FIFA-website.

International goals

See also 

 List of association women football players with 100 or more international goals

References 

Match reports

External links

1973 births
Living people
Footballers from Shanghai
Chinese women's footballers
Women's association football forwards
Atlanta Beat (WUSA) players
Washington Freedom players
Women's United Soccer Association players
Olympic footballers of China
China women's international footballers
1991 FIFA Women's World Cup players
Footballers at the 1994 Asian Games
1995 FIFA Women's World Cup players
Footballers at the 1996 Summer Olympics
Footballers at the 1998 Asian Games
1999 FIFA Women's World Cup players
Footballers at the 2002 Asian Games
2003 FIFA Women's World Cup players
FIFA Century Club
Olympic medalists in football
Asian Games medalists in football
Medalists at the 1994 Asian Games
Medalists at the 1996 Summer Olympics
Medalists at the 1998 Asian Games
Medalists at the 2002 Asian Games
Asian Games gold medalists for China
Asian Games silver medalists for China
Olympic silver medalists for China
Chinese expatriate women's footballers
Chinese expatriate sportspeople in the United States
Expatriate women's soccer players in the United States